The National Committee for a Free Europe, later known as Free Europe Committee, was an anti-communist Central Intelligence Agency (CIA) front organization, founded on June 1, 1949, in New York City, which worked for the spreading of American influence in Europe and to oppose the Soviet one.

History
The committee was founded by Allen Dulles, later to be Director of Central Intelligence, in conjunction with DeWitt Clinton Poole. Early board members included Dwight Eisenhower, Lucius D. Clay, Cecil B. DeMille, Henry Luce, Mark Ethridge, Charles Phelps Taft II and DeWitt Wallace. From 1951 to 1952, Charles Douglas Jackson served as its president. The organization created and oversaw the anti-communist broadcast service Radio Free Europe. CIA subsidies to the Free Europe Committee ended in 1971 which caused restructuring to its operations.

The Free Europe Committee sent balloons with leaflets from West Germany to the Eastern Bloc countries. Each balloon was able to drop 100,000 leaflets.

See also
American Committee for the Liberation of the Peoples of Russia
Balloon campaigns in Korea, for similar balloon-and-leaflet campaigning by South Korean NGOs.
Brutus Coste
Crusade for Freedom
"Free Albania" National Committee
Committee for a Free Lithuania

References

External links 
The Soviet Peace Myth by Leon Dennen, published by the NCFE

1949 establishments in the United States
Anti-communist organizations in the United States
Political advocacy groups in the United States
Soviet Union–United States relations
Organizations established in 1949
Central Intelligence Agency front organizations